is a Japanese footballer.

Club statistics
Updated to 23 February 2018.

1Includes Promotion and Relegation Playoffs.

References

External links
Profile at Matsumoto Yamaga

1988 births
Living people
Doshisha University alumni
Association football people from Fukuoka Prefecture
Japanese footballers
J1 League players
J2 League players
Oita Trinita players
Matsumoto Yamaga FC players
Association football defenders